East Blythe is a former census-designated place (CDP) and unincorporated community in Riverside County, California, United States. The 2000 census population was three.

Geography

Demographics

As of the census of 2000, there were three people, two households, and one family residing in the CDP.  The population density was 5.8 people per square mile (2.3/km2).  There were two housing units at an average density of 3.9 per square mile (1.5/km2).  The racial makeup of the CDP was 100.00% White.

The two households consisted of a married couple living together (one forty-six and one twenty-five to forty-four) and a woman living alone who was sixty-five years of age or older. The average household size was 1.5 and the average family size was two.

Politics
In the state legislature East Blythe is located in the 40th Senate District, represented by Democrat Denise Moreno Ducheny, and in the 80th Assembly District, represented by Republican Bonnie Garcia.

See also
Blythe Intaglios
Chuckawalla Valley State Prison
Chuckwalla
Chuckwalla Mountains
Chocolate Mountains
Desert Center
Coachella Valley
Big Maria Mountains
McCoy Mountains
Cadiz, California
Mule Mountains (California)
Palo Verde, California

References

Former census-designated places in California
Blythe, California
Populated places in the Sonoran Desert